Asian fashion dolls are fashion dolls that are made by Asian manufacturers or primarily targeted to an Asian market. Some have received international attention, such as with Momoko Doll, and in 2005 the first annual Dollstyle convention was held in Tokyo.

Many of these dolls have anime style features. Clothing lines may include Asian themes and in some cases Asian names (such as "Momoko" or "Taeyang"). Some Asian fashion dolls are dominated by Western dress, such as with Momoko Doll's lineup, Pullip's wardrobe,   or the extensive Jenny fashions.

Notable brands
 Pureneemo dolls by Azone (:ja:アゾンインターナショナル)
 Blythe by Takara, formerly by Kenner
 Dollfie, Super Dollfie, and Dollfie Dream by Volks
 Jenny by Takara
 Kurhn doll (Chinese) by Foshan Kurhn Toys
 Licca-chan by Takara
 Momoko Doll by Petworks and Sekiguchi
 Obitsu by Obitsu (:ja:オビツボディ)
 Pullip from Cheonsang Cheonha of South Korea. Manufactured by Groove, formerly by JUN Planning
 Sonokong dolls by Sonokong
 smartdoll.jp by Danny Choo
 YounJi by DollsKorea
 Mimi by MimiWorld

See also
 Ball-jointed doll

References

Fashion dolls